Fantasia for Real is an American reality documentary television series on VH1 that debuted on January 11, 2010. The series chronicles American Idol season 3 winner Fantasia Barrino, along with her family, and her struggle to regain control of both her career and personal life.

Cast
 Fantasia Barrino
 Brian Dickens - Fantasia's manager
 Addie "Aunt Bunny" Washington - Fantasia's aunt
 Diane Barrino-Barber - Fantasia's mother
 Zion Barrino - Fantasia's daughter
 Joseph "Teeny" Barrino, Kassim "Ricco" Barrino and Xavier Barrino - Fantasia's brothers
 Addie Collins - Fantasia's grandmother

Episodes

Season 1 (2010)

Season 2 (2010)

References

External links
 Official site
 Fantasia for Real at The Internet Movie Database

2010s American reality television series
2010 American television series debuts
2010 American television series endings
African-American reality television series
English-language television shows
VH1 original programming
Television series based on singers and musicians
Television shows filmed in North Carolina
Fantasia Barrino